Vollebekk is a station on Grorud Line (line 5) of the Oslo Metro. The station is among the original ones on Grorudbanen, and opened on 10 October 1966. Peer Qvaam was the station's architect.

The local road Lunden passes under the station immediately north of the station. There is no major bus connection, although there is a bus stop on the Østre Aker Vei highway to the south. The railway station Alna is also nearby and there are plans to connect the two stations by means of a pedestrian and bicycle path in 2009.

References

External links

Oslo Metro stations in Oslo
Railway stations opened in 1966
1966 establishments in Norway